Benjamin Creme (5 December 1922 − 24 October 2016) was a Scottish artist, author, esotericist, and editor of Share International magazine.

He asserted that the Second Coming, prophesied by many religions, would come in the form of Maitreya, the World Teacher. Maitreya is the name Buddhists use for the future Buddha, but Creme claimed that Maitreya is the teacher that all religions point towards and hope for, as well as the Head of the Spiritual Hierarchy on Earth. Other names for him, according to Creme, are the Christ, the Imam Mahdi, Krishna, and the Messiah. Creme claimed Maitreya is the "Avatar for the Aquarian Age", is immortal and omniscient, and has lived in London since 19 July 1977. When speaking of Maitreya, Creme insisted that Maitreya is not a religious teacher in the traditional sense, but rather “an educationalist in the widest sense of the word, advocating changes in our political, economic and social life... He comes to show that the spiritual life can be lived in every department of human living--not alone in the religious field.”

Early life
Born in Glasgow, Scotland in 1922, Benjamin Creme’s life and work followed two distinct interests – art and esotericism – which eventually merged as a single path. At the age of thirteen Creme began painting, inspired by the works of Rembrandt. In order to become a painter, he left school at sixteen.  Over the years, Creme befriended and collaborated with many fixtures of the time in British art, music, and literature, developing into a painter in the Modernist style. His style of painting has also been categorized as ”abstractly representational”, and his work has been exhibited by galleries around the world.

Spiritual development and assigned mission by his Master
In direct parallel to his artistic exploration, Creme said he became interested in the occult at the age of fourteen, when he read With Mystics and Magicians in Tibet by Alexandra David-Neel.  Over the years, Creme studied the works of Helena Blavatsky and Alice Bailey, as well as those of Charles Leadbeater, Paul Brunton, George Gurdjieff, Peter Ouspensky and Maurice Nicoll; along with Patanjali, Vivekananda, Sivananda, Yogananda, Krishnamurti, and Ramana Maharshi, all of whom described the existence of a kingdom beyond that of the Human. Creme reiterated that it was this Spiritual Kingdom, or Fifth Kingdom on Earth, that has helped guide human evolution since Humanity’s inception. Creme explained further about how this Kingdom, or Spiritual Hierarchy, is composed of Masters of Wisdom – great beings who have mastered themselves over many life-times.

Creme said that he was first contacted telepathically by his Master in January 1959, when Creme was asked to make tape recordings of his Master's messages. Creme first began to speak publicly of his mission on 30 May 1975, at the Friends Meeting House on Euston Road in London, England. His central message announced the emergence of a group of enlightened spiritual teachers who could guide humanity forward into a new époque, the Aquarian Age of peace and brotherhood based on the principles of love and sharing. At the head of this group would be a great Avatar, Maitreya, the World Teacher, expected by all the major religions as their "Awaited One": the Christ to the Christians, the Imam Mahdi to the Muslims, the Messiah for Jews, and the 5th Buddha (Maitreya) for Buddhists. As early as 1982, however, Creme emphasized that Maitreya would reveal himself fully only when Humanity began to live in right relationship to one another – most notably, by living in peace, and by beginning to share the world’s resources more equitably.

Predictions in 1982 and later 

In the spring of 1982 Creme placed advertisements in newspapers around the world saying, "The Christ is now here." According to Creme, the Christ, whom he also called Maitreya, would begin to announce his existence on worldwide television broadcasts. Creme stated in these newspaper advertisements that the Second Coming of Christ would occur within the next two months. On 14 May 1982 Creme held a press conference in Los Angeles. More than 90 reporters attended and heard Creme announce that Maitreya was living within the Asian community in the Brick Lane area of London. Creme presented the reporters with a challenge: If the media made a serious attempt to seek Maitreya in London, he would reveal himself to them. Afterwards, Creme wrote, "It was hoped that the media would respond to my information at a level which would allow Him to come forward to them. This hope, however, was not fulfilled. While the media did show an interest in the reappearance story, it did not go so far as to actually get involved in searching for Maitreya."

After 1982, Creme made a number of additional predictions and announcements about the imminent appearance of Maitreya, based on his claims of receiving telepathic messages from a Master of Wisdom. Creme said that in January 1986, Maitreya contacted media representatives at the highest level in Britain who agreed to make an announcement. Under pressure from high religious and government officials, however, this statement was withheld.

Creme wrote, "On 26 February 1987 Maitreya gave an interview to the major American television company, Cable News Network (CNN). He was interviewed under His ordinary, everyday name, and did not call Himself the Christ. He did say, however, that, among other names, He was known as Maitreya. A group of His closest associates journeyed to the United States to arrange further interviews[...]" The CNN interview was made available for possible showing in 26 of a promised 29 countries in Europe, Scandinavia, North Africa and the Middle East, but was not broadcast in the United States. The CNN office in Atlanta explained that they could not see a framework in which to present the interview.

In 1997 Creme again announced that there would be additional, global TV broadcasts from Christ/Maitreya, though with far less media interest. Creme stated that when the "Day of Declaration" occurred "The Christ will come on the world's television channels, linked together by satellite. All those with access to television will see ... [his face]. He will establish a telepathic rapport with all humanity simultaneously. While the Christ is speaking... [everyone will feel far more love than they've ever felt before, that massive outpouring of love will cause] hundreds of thousands of 'miracle' cures [to] take place simultaneously."

On 14 January 2010 Creme announced that Maitreya had given his first interview on American television. Soon afterwards several people in the United States, working from Creme's predictions, concluded that the British-American economist and author Raj Patel was Maitreya. After newspaper articles spread this story around the world Creme responded that Raj Patel was not the coming World Teacher in an article in The Guardian under the headline "Raj Patel is Not Maitreya, But the World Teacher is Here — and Needed."

Creme gave lectures around the world for more than 30 years about Maitreya, and a network of volunteers worked with him to give his views to the public. In speaking about his work, Creme said: "My job has been to make the initial approach to the public, to help create a climate of hope and expectancy. If I can do that, I'll be well pleased.”

Although most press coverage of Creme and his information has been skeptical, some members of the news media had positive views of him, such as Canadian broadcasting host/producer Max Allen, who stated, ‘The Maitreya story is important and Creme is an admirable spokesman’." Creme died in October 2016 at the age of 93.

Crop circles and UFOs
From 1957 to 1959 Creme was the vice-president of the Aetherius Society, an organization that maintained that UFOs existed and that the other planets in our solar system were inhabited and supported life, although Humanity had yet to develop etheric sight to ascertain this.  The organization's beliefs were based largely on Theosophy, which integrates the study of religion, philosophy, and science, branching not merely into the Occult but also cosmology. For Theosophists, planets are evolving, living beings that host their own Spiritual Hierarchies.

Creme maintained that most of the UFOs that travelled to Earth came from Mars and Venus, in space-ships manufactured on Mars through a process in which thoughts have the power to materialize things. In addition, Creme believed that the most highly evolved beings of Mars and Venus (that are visible only on the etheric level) have long played a role in not merely uplifting early animal-man, but also in protecting Humanity from its own self by sending UFOs to heal the Earth’s negativity and pollution. Creme asserted that nuclear radiation was the most dangerous of all pollution, while emphasizing that all the nuclear power plants continually leak, but such seepage escapes scientific measurements at this time as radioactive pollution exists largely on the etheric plane.  Creme underscored that it is there that the radioactive waste does the most harm;  it is in that realm that nuclear power threatens all life on our planet and beyond.

In 1958 he met George Adamski and Creme said he could personally vouch for the authenticity of Adamski's UFO contacts.

During an interview in 2006 Creme confirmed his views on the importance of crop circles: "The UFOs have an enormous part to play in the security of this planet at the ecological level. [The crop circles are part of] a new science that will give us energy directly from the sun. Oil will become a thing of the past. No one will be able to sell energy in the future."

Creme gave his explanation as to how crop circles are made by UFOs in his magazine: "The crop circles are there to draw attention to the fact that the Space Brothers are there. They are amazing constructions. They are made in seconds by the 'ships' of the Space Brothers. They are complex and beautiful constructions which cannot be made in any other way. They appear all over the world, but the majority are in the South of England. Why? Because Maitreya is in London."

Predictions and responses
Creme asserted that Maitreya was the World Teacher for the Age of Aquarius, and that during the transition of one astrological cycle to another humans undergo a quickening of their evolution, while experiencing crisis after crisis. Creme underscored that Maitreya "comes to show that the spiritual life can be lived in every department of human living ―  not alone in the religious field; that the scientific path to God, about which he will teach, is wide enough and varied enough to accommodate all men. Everyone, in the future, will come to realize the spiritual basis of life, and will seek to give it expression in his work. And whereas today only the seer or the mystic knows the true meaning of reality, this will be the experience of all men, whatever their way.  Not all men are religious; religion is a way, a specific way."   Between 1989 and 1991, Creme's magazine Share International published a series of purported excerpts of talks given by Maitreya in the London area, recorded by a close associate, and then transmitted to two journalists, Patricha Pitchon and Brian James. Covering modern problems such as addiction, crime, and corruption, Maitreya's dialogues proposed the technique of "honesty of mind, sincerity of spirit and detachment" as the cure, leading to growing awareness. The excerpts also contained prognostications of ongoing world events, including the Fall of the Berlin Wall, the ending of Communist rule in the Soviet Union, the release of Nelson Mandela and the ending of Apartheid in South Africa, the release of Terry Waite, the resignation of Margaret Thatcher, and many more. Sceptics ridiculed the story presented by Benjamin Creme, noting that several of the predictions appeared to have been incorrect. Others have treated Creme's story with interest and are waiting to see what happens. Some fundamentalist Evangelical Christian sources and other detractors accused Creme of being part of a satanic conspiracy and placed him among a number of "antichrist potentials". Yet Creme emphasized  that those who read his own books or listened to his lectures would do best to engage actively with the information he presented, and to verify it for themselves. Creme stated,  “I have never presented Maitreya as a messiah figure who comes to make all things bright and beautiful for a supine humanity. Maitreya himself is at pains to clarify his position that every stone and brick of the new civilisation must be put in place by humanity itself; humanity's free will is sacrosanct.” 

Bibliography
 Creme, Benjamin. The Reappearance of the Christ and the Masters of Wisdom. Tara Press, 1980.
 Creme, Benjamin (ed.). Messages from Maitreya the Christ. (Share International Foundation), 1981, 1986.
 Creme, Benjamin. Transmission: A Meditation for the New Age. Tara Center, 1983.
 Creme, Benjamin (ed.). A Master Speaks. Share International Foundation, 1985.
 Creme, Benjamin. Maitreya's Mission. 3 vols. Share International Foundation, 1986, 1993, 1997.
 Creme, Benjamin. The Ageless Wisdom Teaching: An Introduction to Humanity's Spiritual Legacy. Share International Foundation, 1996.
 Creme, Benjamin. The Great Approach: New Light and Life for Humanity. Share International Foundation, 2001.
 Creme, Benjamin. The Art of Co-operation. Share International Foundation, 2002.
 Creme, Benjamin (ed.). Maitreya's Teachings — The Laws of Life. Share International Foundation, 2005.
 Creme, Benjamin. The Art of Living: Living within the Laws of Life. Share International Foundation, 2006.
 Creme, Benjamin. The World Teacher for All Humanity. Share International Foundation, 2007.
 Creme, Benjamin. The Awakening of Humanity. Share International Foundation, 2008.

See also
Alice A.Bailey
Helena Petrovna Blavatsky 
Helena Roerich
List of Maitreya claimants
Maitreya (Theosophy)
UFO religion

References

External links

 Share International
 Books (Share International) by Benjamin Creme.
  Benjamin Creme Museum

1922 births
2016 deaths
20th-century apocalypticists
21st-century apocalypticists
Esotericists
New Age writers
New Thought writers
Artists from Glasgow
Scottish religious leaders
Scottish spiritual mediums
Scottish Theosophists
Spiritual teachers